A lodestone is a naturally magnetized piece of the mineral magnetite.

Lodestone may also refer to:

Ships
 , a former degaussing vessel of the Royal Navy
 , a former degaussing vessel of the United States Navy

Comics and games
 Lodestone, an alias of DC Comics character Rhea Jones
 Lodestone, a video game developed by Big Robot
 Lodestone Comics, a sister company to Deluxe Comics
 The Lodestone, an official website of Final Fantasy XIV
 Lodestone Games, a game development studio based in Charlottesville, Virginia

Other
 Lodestone (New Zealand), a prominent peak in the Wharepapa / Arthur Range
 Powelliphanta "Lodestone", a species of land snail
 Lodestone Management Consultants, a consulting company based in Switzerland
 Lodestone Theatre Ensemble, a theatre organization based in Los Angeles